Misugiiso Takuya (born 11 May 1956 as Hidenori Kamisawa) is a former sumo wrestler from Hachinohe, Aomori, Japan. He made his professional debut in March 1971, and reached the top division in November 1977. His highest rank was maegashira 2. He was a member of Hanakago stable and served as sword-bearer to his stablemate Wajima during the yokozuna dohyo-iri.
He retired in September 1986, and as of 2021 he is an elder in the Japan Sumo Association under the name Minezaki. He was the head coach of Minezaki stable which he founded in 1988 until its closure in 2021. He speaks English due to his frequent trips to Hawaii. He is married with one son. After reaching 65 years of age in May 2021 he was re-employed for a further five years as a consultant.

Career record

See also
Glossary of sumo terms
List of past sumo wrestlers
List of sumo elders
List of sumo tournament second division champions

References

1956 births
Living people
Japanese sumo wrestlers
Sumo people from Aomori Prefecture